Theta group may refer to:

 Theta subgroup of the modular group
 Theta (SIS radio group), a radio communications cell in the Norwegian Resistance
 Theta representation of the Heisenberg group